Margarita Gidion (born 18 December 1994) is a German footballer who plays as a midfielder for FC Basel. She made two appearances for the Germany national team in 2015.

Career
In January 2023 Gidion left Frauen-Bundesliga club Werder Bremen to join Swiss Women's Super League side FC Basel.

References

External links
 

1994 births
Living people
People from Lörrach
Sportspeople from Freiburg (region)
German women's footballers
Footballers from Baden-Württemberg
Women's association football midfielders
Germany women's international footballers
SC Freiburg (women) players
SGS Essen players
Eintracht Frankfurt (women) players
SV Werder Bremen (women) players
FC Basel Frauen players